The 53rd Kentucky Mounted Infantry Regiment was a mounted infantry regiment that served in the Union Army during the American Civil War.

Service
The 53rd Kentucky Mounted Infantry Regiment was organized at Covington, Kentucky and mustered in September 1864 under the command of Colonel Clinton J. True.

The regiment was attached to Military District of Kentucky and Department of Kentucky, to September 1865.

The 53rd Kentucky Mounted Infantry mustered out of service September 17, 1865, in Louisville, Kentucky.

Detailed service
Guard duty along the Kentucky Central Railroad between Lexington and Cincinnati. Scouting in central Kentucky and operating against guerrillas until November 1864. Moved to Crab Orchard, Kentucky, November 24, and joined General Stoneman. Stoneman's Raid into southwest Virginia December 10–29. Near Marion, Virginia, December 17–18. Saltville, Virginia, December 20–21. Capture and destruction of salt works. Operating against guerrillas at various points in Kentucky by detachments until September 1865.

Casualties
The regiment lost a total of 49 men during service; 1 officer and 8 enlisted men killed or mortally wounded, 40 enlisted men died of disease.

Commanders
 Colonel John H. Grider
Fifty-third Infantry (Mounted).—Colonel, Clinton J. True; Lieut.-Colonel, W. C. Johnson; Major, James G. Francis.

See also

 List of Kentucky Civil War Units
 Kentucky in the Civil War

References
 Dyer, Frederick H.  A Compendium of the War of the Rebellion (Des Moines, IA:  Dyer Pub. Co.), 1908.
Attribution
 

Military units and formations established in 1864
Military units and formations disestablished in 1865
Units and formations of the Union Army from Kentucky
1864 establishments in Kentucky